McAdoo may refer to:

People
 McAdoo (surname)

U.S. places
 McAdoo Township, Barber County, Kansas
 McAdoo, Pennsylvania
 McAdoo, Texas

See also
USS Grumium (AK-112/AVS-3), laid down as the SS William G. McAdoo.